Emily Grace Bevan (born 11 August 1982) is an English actress. She is best known for her roles in The Casual Vacancy and In the Flesh.

Early life and education
Bevan was born in Shrewsbury, Shropshire. Her father was headmaster of a boys’ school and mother is a midwife. She is the youngest of four children. She attended Royal Central School of Speech and Drama and received a Master of Arts degree in classical acting.

Filmography

Television

Theatre

Audio-book narrator

References

External links

Living people
1982 births
Alumni of the Royal Central School of Speech and Drama
English television actresses
English film actresses
English stage actresses
Actors from Shrewsbury